AM 738 4to, Edda oblongata or Langa Edda, is a late 17th-century Icelandic paper manuscript currently housed in the Árni Magnússon Institute for Icelandic Studies, Reykjavík. The manuscript is most notable for its distinct oblong format and the numerous colorful illustrations it contains.

Description 

The manuscript consists of 135 leaves and is unusually tall compared to its width (33 cm x 10.5 cm). Dated to c. 1680, it contains a diverse collection of texts including chapters from the Prose Edda as well as numerous Eddic poems, a variety of skaldic poetry, a rune poem, the Christian visionary poem Sólarljóð, and many other short texts. Among the latter are three poems by minister and poet Hallgrímur Pétursson, including his well-known Aldarháttur. The only other contemporary poet identified by name in the manuscript is Oddr Þórðarson, who is otherwise not well known.

History 
Preceding the chapters from the Prose Edda, the manuscript features an illustrated title page that suggests this part, and perhaps the entire manuscript, was completed in 1680. The same page features the initials "S G," which may refer to the name of the scribe and/or illustrator of the manuscript. These initials possibly allude to Sigurður Gíslason (1655–1688), a poet whom the manuscript collector Árni Magnússon identified as an owner of the manuscript. However, the initials "G S S" also appear near the end of the manuscript and may refer to the involvement of another unidentified scribe.

At some point, Ingibjörg Jónsdóttir (1643–1710), who was the half-sister of Sigurður Gíslason, the manuscript's probable scribe and/or illustrator, took possession of the manuscript. Following this, it came into the ownership of Magnús Jónsson from Leirá (c. 1679–1702), a schoolmaster in Skálholt. According to his notes, Árni Magnússon received the manuscript from Magnús around the year 1700 and it remained in Copenhagen until 1991 when it was returned to Iceland. It is currently housed at the Árni Magnússon Institute for Icelandic Studies in Reykjavík, and a digitized version of the manuscript is available on Handrit.is.

Illustrations 
The manuscript contains numerous colorful illustrations, most of which depict subjects from Norse mythology. Other small decorative drawings appear in several places in the manuscript.

References

External links

 Digitized version of AM 738 4to from Handrit.is.

Literary illuminated manuscripts
Icelandic manuscripts
17th-century illuminated manuscripts
Sources of Norse mythology
1680s books
Árni Magnússon Institute for Icelandic Studies collection